Jefferson County Courthouse or variation prefaced with Old may refer to:

 Jefferson County Courthouse (Bessemer, Alabama), a contributing building in the Downtown Bessemer Historic District, listed on the National Register of Historic Places (NRHP)
 Jefferson County Courthouse (Birmingham, Alabama)
 Jefferson County Courthouse (Arkansas), Pine Bluff, Arkansas, a contributing building in the NRHP-listed Pine Bluff Commercial Historic District
 Jefferson County Courthouse (Florida), Monticello, Florida, a contributing building in the NRHP-listed Monticello Historic District
 Jefferson County Courthouse (Georgia), Louisville, Georgia, NRHP-listed
 Jefferson County Courthouse (Idaho), Rigby, Idaho, NRHP-listed
 Jefferson County Courthouse (Illinois)
 Jefferson County Courthouse (Iowa), NRHP-listed
 Jefferson County Courthouse (Kansas), Oskaloosa, Kansas
 Louisville Metro Hall, formerly known as Jefferson County Courthouse, in Louisville, Kentucky
 Jefferson County Courthouse Annex, Louisville, Kentucky
Old Jefferson Parish Courthouse, Gretna, Louisiana, NRHP-listed
Jefferson County Courthouse (Mississippi), designed by architect of Pointe Coupee Parish Courthouse
 Jefferson County Courthouse (Montana), Boulder, Montana, NRHP-listed
 Jefferson County Courthouse (Nebraska), Fairbury, Nebraska, NRHP-listed
 Jefferson County Courthouse Complex, Watertown, New York, NRHP-listed
 Jefferson County Courthouse (Ohio), Steubenville, Ohio
 Jefferson County Courthouse (Oklahoma), Waurika, Oklahoma, NRHP-listed
 Jefferson County Courthouse (Texas), Beaumont, Texas, NRHP-listed
 Jefferson County Courthouse (Washington), Port Townsend, Washington, NRHP-listed
 Jefferson County Courthouse (West Virginia), Charles Town, West Virginia, NRHP-listed